Bangalore Education Society is a co-educational school in Malleswaram, in the north-west of Bangalore, Karnataka, India. It is situated off Margosa Road in 8th Cross Malleswaram next to Gandhi Sahitya Sanga. 
It offers Karnataka State Board Syllabus with three languages, Kannada, Sanskrit and English with Hindi as an optional language.

References

High schools and secondary schools in Bangalore